The Georgia Tech Athletic Association is a non-profit organization responsible for maintaining the intercollegiate athletic program at Georgia Tech. The Athletic Association is overseen by the Georgia Tech Athletic Board. The Georgia Tech Athletic Association sponsors varsity intercollegiate athletics competition in the following sports:

Men's Intercollegiate Sports
 Football
 Baseball
 Men's Basketball
 Golf
 Tennis
 Indoor and outdoor track
 Cross country
 Swimming and Diving

Women's Intercollegiate Sports
 Basketball
 Softball
 Tennis
 Indoor and outdoor track
 Cross country
 Swimming and Diving
 Volleyball

History
The Athletic Association was established in January 1901.

References

External links
https://ramblinwreck.com/

Official website

Georgia Tech Yellow Jackets